Subodh Raghunath Shenoy (born 16 October 1947) is an Indian condensed matter physicist and a former professor at the Tata Institute of Fundamental Research. He has also been associated with the Indian Institute of Science Education and Research, Thiruvananthapuram. Known for his studies on Condensed matter physics and Statistical physics, his research covered topological defect-mediated phase transitions, vortex dynamics and decay kinetics of metastability.

Shenoy is an elected fellow of the Indian Academy of Sciences. The Council of Scientific and Industrial Research, the apex agency of the Government of India for scientific research, awarded him the Shanti Swarup Bhatnagar Prize for Science and Technology, one of the highest Indian science awards, for his contributions to physical sciences in 1992.

See also 
 Condensed matter theory

Notes

References

External links 
 

Recipients of the Shanti Swarup Bhatnagar Award in Physical Science
Indian scientific authors
Fellows of the Indian Academy of Sciences
1947 births
Academic staff of Tata Institute of Fundamental Research
Indian condensed matter physicists
Living people